Celestine Romed Ngah Kebe (born 1984 in Akonolinga) is a retired Cameroonian association football forward who laste played for Brown de Adrogué of the Primera B Metropolitana in Argentina.

Teams
  2 de Mayo 2006
  Sportivo Luqueño 2007-2008
  Cruz del Sur 2009-2010
  Brown de Adrogué 2010

See also
 List of expatriate footballers in Paraguay
 Players and Records in Paraguayan Football

References

External links
 Football Data Base Profile

1984 births
Living people
Cameroonian footballers
2 de Mayo footballers
Sportivo Luqueño players
Club Atlético Brown footballers
Cameroonian expatriate footballers
Expatriate footballers in Paraguay
Expatriate footballers in Argentina
Cameroonian expatriate sportspeople in Paraguay
Cameroonian expatriate sportspeople in Argentina
Association football forwards